In Christianity, a Eucharistic miracle is any miracle involving the Eucharist. The Roman Catholic, Lutheran, Eastern Orthodox, Methodist, Anglican and Oriental Orthodox Churches believe that Christ is really made manifest in the Eucharist and deem this a Eucharistic miracle; however, this is to be distinguished from other manifestations of God. The Catholic Church distinguishes between divine revelation, such as the Eucharist, and private revelation, such as Eucharistic miracles. In general, reported Eucharistic miracles usually consist of unexplainable phenomena such as consecrated Hosts visibly transforming into myocardium tissue, being preserved for extremely long stretches of time, surviving being thrown into fire, bleeding, or even sustaining people for decades.

Verification of Eucharistic miracles often depends on the religious branch reporting the supposed miracle, but in the case of the Catholic Church, a special task-force or commission investigates supposed Eucharistic miracles before deciding whether they are "worthy of belief." As with other private revelations, such as Marian apparitions, belief in approved miracles is not mandated by the Catholic Church, but often serves to reassure believers of God's presence or as the means to "send a message" to the population at large. Anglican Churches have also reported extraordinary Eucharistic miracles.

Real Presence

Roman Catholic Eucharistic Doctrine draws upon a quasi-Aristotelian understanding of reality, in which the core substance or essential reality of a given thing is bound to, but not equivalent with, its sensible realities or accidents. In the celebration of the Eucharist, by means of the consecratory Eucharistic Prayer, the actual substance of the bread and wine are changed into the body and blood of Christ. This change in substance is not, however, the outward appearances of the bread and wine—their accidents—which remain as before. This substantial change is called transubstantiation, a term reserved to describe the change itself. Scholastic philosophical terminology was used but is not a part of the dogma that defined Christ's presence for the Roman Catholic Church at the Council of Trent. In the 13th session of 11 October 1551, it promulgated the following conciliar decree: "if anyone says that the substance of bread and wine remains in the Holy Sacrament of the Eucharist together with the Body and
Blood of our Lord Jesus Christ and denies that wonderful and extraordinary change of the whole substance of the wine into His blood, while only the species of bread and wine remain, a change which the Catholic Church has most fittingly called transubstantiation, let him be anathema." (Session 13, can.2)".Protestant views on the fact of Christ's presence in the Eucharist vary significantly from one denomination to another: while many, such as Lutherans, Anglicans, Methodists and the Reformed agree with Roman Catholics that Christ is really present in the Eucharist, they do not accept the definition of transubstantiation to describe it.

According to Thomas Aquinas, in the case of extraordinary Eucharistic Miracles in which the appearance of the accidents are altered, this further alteration is not considered to be transubstantiation, but is a subsequent miracle that takes place for the building up of faith. Nor does the extraordinary manifestation alter or heighten the presence of Christ in the Eucharist, as the miracle does not manifest the physical presence of Christ: "in apparitions of this sort ... the proper species [actual flesh and blood] of Christ is not seen, but a species formed miraculously either in the eyes of the viewers, or in the sacramental dimensions themselves."Some denominations, especially Lutherans, have similar beliefs regarding the Eucharist and the Real Presence, though they reject the Roman Catholic concept of transubstantiation, preferring instead, the doctrine of the sacramental union, in which "the body and blood of Christ are so truly united to the bread and wine of the Holy Communion that the two may be identified. They are at the same time body and blood, bread and wine. ...In this sacrament the Lutheran Christian receives the very body and blood of Christ precisely for the strengthening of the union of faith." Lutherans hold that the miracle of the Eucharist is effected during the Words of Institution. Both the Eastern Orthodox Churches and the Oriental Orthodox Churches, such as the Coptic Church, insist "on the reality of the change from bread and wine into the body and the blood of Christ at the consecration of the elements," although they have "never attempted to explain the manner of the change," thus rejecting philosophical terms to describe it. The Methodist Church similarly holds that Christ is truly present in the Eucharist "through the elements of bread and wine," but maintains that how He is present is a Holy Mystery.<ref name="Neal2014">{{cite book|last=Neal|first=Gregory S.|title=Sacramental Theology and the Christian Life|date=19 December 2014|publisher=WestBow Press|language=en |isbn=9781490860077|page=111|quote=For Anglicans and Methodists the reality of the presence of Jesus as received through the sacramental elements is not in question. Real presence is simply accepted as being true, its mysterious nature being affirmed and even lauded in official statements like This Holy Mystery: A United Methodist Understanding of Holy Communion.}}</ref> All Anglicans affirm the real presence of Christ in the Eucharist, though Evangelical Anglicans believe that this is a pneumatic presence, while those of an Anglo-Catholic churchmanship believe this is a corporeal presence, but at the same time still rejecting the philosophical explanation of transubstantiation.

Extraordinary Eucharistic miracles

Roman Catholic
Mystical Fasting
Some Catholic saints reportedly survived for years on nothing but the Eucharist. Marthe Robin fasted from all food and drink except the Eucharist from 1930 to her death in 1981.

Brazilian Servant of God Floripes Dornellas de Jesus lived for 60 years feeding with Eucharist only.

Teresa Neumann, the famed Catholic Stigmatic from Bavaria subsisted on no solid food but the Holy Eucharist from 1926 until her death in 1962 some 36 years later. In a biography written about her she stated that numerous times she attempted to eat other things only to have them regurgitate immediately upon attempting to swallow them.

Supernatural Communion
Some saints reportedly received Holy Communion from angels. One example is the visionaries of Our Lady of Fatima receiving the Eucharist from an angel. The angel, "whiter than snow, ... quite transparent, and as brilliant as crystal in the rays of the sun," proffered the Eucharist host and chalice to the Holy Trinity in reparation for the sins committed against Jesus Christ, then administered the Eucharist to the visionaries and instructed them to make acts of reparation. Another example is Saint Faustina receiving the Eucharist from a seraph. At one time, she saw a dazzling seraph dressed in a gold robe, with a transparent surplice and stole, holding a crystal chalice covered in a transparent veil, which he gave Faustina to drink. At another time, when she was doubting, Jesus and a seraph appeared before her. She asked Jesus, but when he did not reply, she asked the seraph if he could hear her confession. The seraph replied, "no spirit in heaven has that power" and administered the Eucharist to her.

 Flesh, blood and levitation 
The rarest reported type of Eucharistic miracle is where the Eucharist becomes human flesh as in the miracle of Lanciano which some believe occurred at Lanciano, Italy in the 8th century. In fact, Lanciano is only one of the reported cases of Eucharistic miracles where the host has been transformed into human flesh. However, a Eucharistic miracle more commonly reported is that of the Bleeding Host, where blood starts to trickle from a consecrated host, the bread consecrated during Mass. Other types of purported miracles include consecrated hosts being preserved for hundreds of years, such as the event of the Miraculous Hosts of Siena. Other miracles include a consecrated host passing through a fire unscathed, stolen consecrated hosts vanishing and turning up in churches, and levitating consecrated hosts.The Mass at Bolsena, depicted in a famous fresco by Raphael at the Vatican in Rome, was an incident said to have taken place in 1263. A Bohemian priest who doubted the doctrine of transubstantiation, celebrated Mass at Bolsena, a town north of Rome. During the Mass the bread of the eucharist began to bleed. The blood from the host fell onto the altar linen in the shape of the face of Jesus as traditionally represented, and the priest came to believe. 

In 1264, Pope Urban IV instituted the Feast of Corpus Christi.

There have been numerous other alleged miracles involving consecrated Hosts. Several of these are described below.

A story from Amsterdam, 1345, claims that a priest was called to administer Viaticum to a dying man. He told the family that if the man threw up, they were to take the contents and throw it in the fire. The man threw up, and the family did what the priest had advised them to do. The next morning, one of the women went to rake the fire and noticed the Host sitting on the grate, unscathed and surrounded by a light. It has apparently passed into both the man's digestive system and the fire unscathed. The story is commemorated with an annual silent procession through central Amsterdam.

According to another story, a farmer in Bavaria took a consecrated Host from Mass to his house, believing that it would give him and his family good fortune. However he was plagued by the feeling that what he had done was very wrong and turned to go back to the church to confess his sin. As he turned, the Host flew from his hand, floated in the air and landed on the ground. He searched for it, but he could not see it. He went back accompanied by many villagers and the priest who bent to pick up the Host, having seen it from some distance off. It again flew up into the air, floated, and fell to the ground and disappeared. The bishop was informed and he came to the site and bent to pick up the Host. Again it flew into the air, remained suspended for an extended time, fell to the ground and disappeared.

An alleged 1370 Brussels miracle involves an allegation of host desecration; a Jew attempted to stab several Hosts, but they miraculously bled and were otherwise unharmed. The Hosts were venerated in later centuries.

Caesarius of Heisterbach recounts various tales of Eucharistic miracles in his book Dialogue on Miracles''; most of the stories he tells are from word of mouth. They include Gotteschalk of Volmarstein who saw an infant in the Eucharist, a priest from Wickindisburg who saw the Host turn into raw flesh, and a man from Hemmenrode who saw an image of a crucified Jesus and blood dripping from the Host. All of these images, however, eventually reverted into the Host. Caesarius also recounts more extraordinary tales, such as bees creating a shrine to Jesus after a piece of the Eucharist was placed in a beehive, a church that was burnt to ashes while the pyx containing the Eucharist was still intact, and a woman who found the Host transformed into congealed blood after she stored it in a box.

In 2016, in Aalst, a small town in Flanders (Belgium), a 200 years old eucharistic host in a monstrance, suddenly showed blood red colour. On July the 7th at 17h45 this Eucharistic host spontaneously started colouring, in the presence of several witnesses. The phenomenon occurred in the home of Father Eric Jacqmin, a member of the SSPX. Professor Liesbeth Jacxsens has offered to scientifically investigate the host and thinks the colour could be caused by Serratia marcescens, Monilia sitophila or Oidium.

Anglican
At the 2017 Synodal Mass held at Corpus Christi Anglican Church in Rogers, Arkansas, Rev. Fr. Jason Rice of the Holy Catholic Church Anglican Rite, a Continuing Anglican denomination, affirmed a Eucharistic miracle in which "an image of a heavenly host appeared directly over the chalice immediately after the words of consecration."

Eastern Orthodox
Eastern Orthodox Christians assume the possibility of a eucharistic miracle occurring for example as a result of disbelief. As such, the bread and wine of changed apparition are not considered to be the Body and Blood of Christ, and neither would their adoration be practiced as in the Roman Catholic Church.

See also 
Carlo Acutis
Eucharistic theology
Serratia marcescens – bacteria that can colonize flour/bread/wafer and give it red color, sometimes even resembling blood stains.

References

Further reading

External links 
 Eucharistic Miracles – List of Eucharistic miracles catalogued by Blessed Carlo Acutis
 The Real Presence Association – Exhibition of the Eucharistic miracles of the World

Eucharist in the Catholic Church
Christian miracles
Eucharist